WAWS (107.3 FM) is a Christian radio station licensed to Claxton, Georgia, United States. The station is currently owned by Educational Media Foundation (EMF). WAWS carries EMF's Air1 contemporary worship format.

History
The station was assigned the WCLA-FM call letters on August 28, 1972; the station signed on September 12. On July 8, 2004, the station changed its call sign to WMCD. The WMCD call had belonged to a Statesboro FM station in the 1960s until the early 2000s.

On August 9, 2018, WMCD swapped call signs with then sister station WZBX. Effective August 31, 2018, the sale of WZBX by Radio Statesboro, Inc. to Educational Media Foundation was consummated at a purchase price of $150,000. EMF changed the station's call sign to WLGK the same day.

The station changed its call sign to WAWS on December 20, 2019.

References

External links

Educational Media Foundation radio stations
Air1 radio stations
Contemporary Christian radio stations in the United States
Radio stations established in 1972
1972 establishments in Georgia (U.S. state)
AWS (FM)